The National Highway 75 or the N-75 is one of Pakistan National Highway running from Capital city of Islamabad to the town of kohala via Murree in Punjab. Its total length is 90 km and it is maintained and operated by Pakistan's National Highway Authority.

See also 
 Motorways of Pakistan
 Transport in Pakistan

References

External links
 National Highway Authority

Roads in Pakistan
Roads in Punjab, Pakistan